(+)-cis-2-Aminomethylcyclopropane carboxylic acid ((+)-CAMP) is an agonist for the GABAA-rho receptor.

References

Amino acids
Cyclopropanes
GABAA-rho receptor agonists